Lee Hunter (born 5 October 1969) is an English former footballer who played in the Football League as a winger for Colchester United.

Career

Born in Oldham, Hunter signed for Colchester United as an apprentice from the club's youth team, making his first-team debut at Layer Road on 6 May 1988 in a 0–0 draw with Tranmere Rovers, a match in which he started. He made nine appearances for the club in the Football League, starting five and coming on as a substitute on four occasions. He played his final game for the club on 21 April 1989 in a 1–1 home draw with Carlisle United, coming on for Stuart Hicks. He would later play for Wivenhoe Town, Wigan Athletic, Hendon, Chelmsford City, Boreham Wood, Braintree Town, Braintree Town, Clacton Town and Maldon Town.

References

1969 births
Living people
Footballers from Oldham
English footballers
Association football wingers
Colchester United F.C. players
Wivenhoe Town F.C. players
Wigan Athletic F.C. players
Hendon F.C. players
Chelmsford City F.C. players
Boreham Wood F.C. players
Braintree Town F.C. players
Diss Town F.C. players
F.C. Clacton players
Maldon & Tiptree F.C. players
English Football League players